This village is located in Baladeh district and according to the Census of Iran in year 2006, its population was 285.

▪This village is in the vicinity of the village (Kala)

About village:

Village on the slopes of Alborz Mountains in Mazandaran Province.  This village is located in Baladeh district, Noor city.

rural and pristine countryside with high mountains, abundant springs and very rare medicinal plants.  The village is very old and no one knows for sure, but it is reported to have been around for more than 700 years. With a hospitable people‌.

Village sections:

Abilak - Cheshme sar - Koresar - Tape sar - Lazir

Mohammadreza Hedayati

References 

Populated places in Nur County